Yesmore Mutero (1979 or 1980 – 28 March 2005) was a Zimbabwean footballer who played as a forward. She has been a member of the Zimbabwe women's national team.

International career
Mutero capped for Zimbabwe at senior level during the 2000 African Women's Championship.

International goals
Scores and results list Zimbabwe goal tally first

Death
Mutero died of an AIDS-related illness on 28 March 2005. She was 25 years old.

References

20th-century births
2005 deaths

Year of birth uncertain
Zimbabwean women's footballers
Women's association football forwards
Zimbabwe women's international footballers
AIDS-related deaths in Zimbabwe